William Edward Pavey (26 September 1913 – 14 June 1982) was an Australian rules footballer who played with Hawthorn in the Victorian Football League (VFL).

The son of William Edward Pavey snr (1888–1961) and Mary Elizabeth Pavey, nee Travers (1890–1952), William Edward Pavey was born in Yarraville on 26 September 1913.

Notes

External links 

Bill Pavey's profile at Australianfootball.com

1913 births
1982 deaths
Australian rules footballers from Melbourne
Hawthorn Football Club players
People from Yarraville, Victoria